Latin music in the United States is defined by both the Recording Industry Association of America (RIAA) and Billboard magazine as any release with 51% or more of its content recorded in Spanish. Since 2010, Billboard has tracked the best-selling Latin Digital Songs chart on January 23, 2010 which shows the top downloaded Spanish-language song of the week. On October 11, 2012, the methodology for the Hot Latin Songs chart were changed to include sales of digital downloads and streaming activity as well as excluding non predominately Spanish languages from appearing on the chart. As a result, English-language versions of a track sung in Spanish are not factored to the digital sales of a Latin song.

Sales certifications for US singles sales are awarded by the RIAA. The RIAA began awarding certifications in 1958. Certifications are based on unit retail sales: sales of 500,000 were awarded gold, 1,000,000 for platinum and 2,000,000 or more for multi-platinum. Beginning on May 9, 2013, the RIAA updated the methodology for singles to include digital downloads and streaming (with 100 streams counting as one download). Since February 1, 2016, 150 streams are equivalent to one download.

In 2000, the RIAA launched Latin certifications to acknowledge that market in the United States. The thresholds for a Latin certification were — 50,000 for gold, 100,000 for platinum, and 200,000 or more for multi-platinum. "La Bomba" by Azul Azul was the only single to receive a Latin certification based on units sold to retails (it was certified platinum). On December 20, 2013, the RIAA established the Latin Digital Singles Award for Spanish-language digital songs. The threshold for the Latin digital songs are 30,000 for gold, 60,000 platinum, and 120,000 or more for multi-platinum. The Latin Digital Singles Awards uses the same methodology as the Digital Singles Award. The RIAA also awards the Latin diamond certification for singles that have been certified at least 10× multi-platinum for sales plus track-equivalent streams of 600,000 units. "Ay Vamos" and "6 AM" by J Balvin are the first Latin singles to receive the diamond (Latin) award. As of January 2018, the highest-certified Latin single is "Despacito" by Luis Fonsi and Daddy Yankee, which has been awarded a diamond certification.

Best-selling singles

Records

English-language songs by Latin artists with Spanish versions

Since Billboard and the RIAA only provide overall sales of a song without separating Spanish-language versions of a track sung in English, some Spanish versions' sales are incalculable. Counting both versions, "Hips Don't Lie" by Shakira featuring Wyclef Jean sold 3,553,000 copies, "She Wolf" by Shakira sold 1,812,000 as of March 2014, "Waka Waka (This Time for Africa)" by Shakira featuring Freshlyground sold 1,763,000 as of March 2014, and "Livin' La Vida Loca" by Ricky Martin sold 1,100,000 physical copies as of 1999 and 502,000 digital units as of 2011.

Spanglish songs performed mainly in English
Since Billboard and Nielsen SoundScan are inconsistent with the definition of Latin music (Billboard states that the US Latin Digital Songs chart only ranks Spanish-language songs but the English-language song "Conga" was ranked on the 2016 US Latin Digital Songs year-end chart), some Spanglish songs primarily sung in English were excluded from the table above. Following that, "I Know You Want Me (Calle Ocho)" by Pitbull sold over two million digital units as of November 2009 and "Bailamos" by Enrique Iglesias sold 700,000 physical copies as of 1999.

Best-selling single by year
This is a list of the best-selling Latin digital songs in the United States since 2010.

2010: "Dile al Amor" by Aventura and "Mi Niña Bonita" by Chino & Nacho – 100,000+
2011: "Danza Kuduro" by Don Omar featuring Lucenzo
2012: "Danza Kuduro" by Don Omar featuring Lucenzo – 542,000
2013: "Danza Kuduro" by Don Omar featuring Lucenzo – 230,000 
2014: "Bailando" by Enrique Iglesias featuring Descemer Bueno and Gente de Zona – 221,000 
2015: "Bailando" by Enrique Iglesias featuring Descemer Bueno and Gente de Zona
2016: "Hasta El Amanecer" by Nicky Jam – 202,000
2017: "Despacito" by Luis Fonsi featuring Daddy Yankee, or Luis Fonsi and Daddy Yankee featuring Justin Bieber – 2,692,000

See also

List of best-selling singles in the United States
List of best-selling Latin albums in the United States

Notes

References

American music industry
Latin